The 1962–63 Copa México also known as the Copa Presidente Adolfo López Mateos is the 47th staging of the Copa México, but the 21st staging in the professional era.

The competition started on April 20, 1963, and concluded on June 2, 1963, with the Final, held at the Estadio Olímpico Universitario in Mexico City, in which Guadalajara lifted the trophy for first time ever with a 2-1 victory over Club Atlante.

Preliminary round

|}

Final round

Quarterfinals
First Leg

Second Leg

Semifinals
First Leg

Second Leg

Final

References
Hemeroteca El Informador

Copa MX
Cop